Rural Community Transportation, Inc. (RCT) is a nonprofit, public transportation system headquartered in Lyndonville, Vermont. RCT serves the Northeast Kingdom (Caledonia, Essex and Orleans counties) and Lamoille county. It provides regular bus and shuttle routes for commuters and shoppers as well as on-demand rides. RCT is heavily supported by volunteer drivers and a number of community partners.

Route List
Current routes can be found in the RCT Passenger Guide.

This information is current as of July 2021.

References

External links
Rural Community Transportation website

Bus transportation in Vermont
Transportation in Caledonia County, Vermont
Transportation in Essex County, Vermont
Transportation in Lamoille County, Vermont
Transportation in Orleans County, Vermont
Transportation in Franklin County, Vermont
Transportation in Washington County, Vermont